C.C.S. was the second studio album of the British blues and jazz outfit CCS, led by guitarist Alexis Korner. This album is usually called C.C.S. 2  to avoid confusion with the first, eponymous album, even though that title cannot be found anywhere on the record or sleeve.

It included covers of songs by such diverse artists as Led Zeppelin and The Jackson 5. On the UK Official Chart, the album charted at number 23, while the single "Brother" charted at number 25.

Track listing

Side one
 "Brother" (Alexis Korner) – 3:23
 "Black Dog" (Robert Plant, Jimmy Page, John Paul Jones) – 4:07
 "I Want You Back" (The Corporation) – 3:41
 "Running Out of Sky (Sky Diver)" (John Cameron) – 3:58
 "Whole Lotta Rock 'n' Roll" – 6:11
 "School Day" (Chuck Berry)
 "Long Tall Sally" (Albert Collins, Richard Penniman)
 "Whole Lotta Love" (Page, John Bonham, Jones, Plant)

Side two
 "Chaos: Can't We Ever Get It Back" (Korner) – 8:52
 "This Is My Life" (Peter Thorup) – 3:51
 "Misunderstood" (Cameron) – 2:46
 "Maggie's Song" (Korner) – 3:39
 "City" (Cameron) – 3:34

Personnel

Musicians
 Alexis Korner – guitar, vocals
 Peter Thorup – vocals
 Herbie Flowers – bass
 Tony Carr – drums
 Harold Beckett, Henry Lowther – trumpet
 Harold McNair – woodwinds

Technical
 Mickie Most – producer
 John Cameron – arranger
 John Kurlander – engineer

References

1972 albums
CCS (band) albums
Albums arranged by John Cameron (musician)
Albums produced by Mickie Most
Rak Records albums